Salafia a surname. Notable people with the surname include: 

 Alfredo Salafia (1869–1933) a Sicilian embalmer and taxidermist
 Michael Salafia, Australian rugby league footballer of the 1990s
 Vincent Salafia, Irish lawyer and environmentalist

See also
Salafi movement, a Sunni Islam movement